STCS is the initialism for:

 Saginaw Township Community Schools
 Southern Tier Catholic School
 St. Clairsville-Richland City School District
 St. Theresa's Convent Sr. Sec. School